The 2014–15 season was Dukla Prague's fourth consecutive season in the Czech First League.

Players

Squad information

Transfers 
French striker Jean-David Beauguel – who played the previous season in the Eredivisie - joined the club on a three-year contract after scoring four goals in a pre-season friendly.

Two midfielders joined Dukla, both signing three-year contracts with the club. These were Slovak Jakub Považanec, previously with Banská Bystrica, and Bosnian Aldin Čajić, who previously played for Teplice. Slovak goalkeeper Martin Chudý and Croatian defender Dino Kluk also joined the club.

Defenders Vyacheslav Karavayev (CSKA Moscow), Roman Polom (Sparta Prague) and forward Michal Krmenčík (Plzeň) all joined the club on season-long loans.

Last season's top goalscorer, striker Zbyněk Pospěch, left the club after two seasons and joined German side FC Energie Cottbus in the summer.

Two defenders left the club: Spaniard José Romera transferred to league rivals FK Jablonec after two years in Prague, while Croatian Tomislav Božić moved to Polish side Górnik Łęczna.

After a season with Dukla, midfielder Milan Černý left the club to play for former club Slavia Prague. Forward Josef Marek, defender Ľuboš Hanzel and goalkeeper Tomáš Kučera also left the club following the expiry of their contracts.

In the winter transfer window, the team's attacking options were strengthened with the loan signings of strikers Tomáš Přikryl (Sparta Prague), Jan Blažek (Liberec) and Nikolai Dergachyov (CSKA Moscow).

Management and coaching staff

Source:

Statistics

Appearances and goals

Goalscorers

Home attendance

Czech First League

Cup 

As a First League team, Dukla entered the Cup at the second round stage. In the second round, Dukla faced third league side Domažlice. The first half finished goalless, but a penalty put the home side ahead just before the hour mark. Two further goals followed for the home team; Marek Hanousek's injury time goal made no difference to the result as the First League side succumbed to a 3–1 defeat and elimination in their first game of the season's competition.

References 

Dukla Prague
FK Dukla Prague seasons